The Canisteo Living Sign is a historic civic project that was built by Ed Childs and Harry Smith, donated to the Canisteo School District, that also served as a navigational aid, located at Canisteo in Steuben County, New York. The sign consists of a set of 260 pine trees that spell out the name "Canisteo." The sign was originally laid out in 1933. The sign was cleared in April 2016 and subsequently replanted beginning in May 2016 due to a number of dead and dying trees.

It was listed on the National Register of Historic Places in 2004.

The sign can be seen as an unconventional form of hillside letters.

References

External links
The Living Canisteo Sign picture

Buildings and structures on the National Register of Historic Places in New York (state)
Individual signs in the United States
Buildings and structures completed in 1933
Buildings and structures in Steuben County, New York
Tourist attractions in Steuben County, New York
National Register of Historic Places in Steuben County, New York
Individual signs on the National Register of Historic Places
1933 establishments in New York (state)
Canisteo, New York